The Ministry of Health and Child Care (MoHCC) is the government ministry responsible for health in Zimbabwe. Retired General Constantino Dominic Chiwenga was appointed to head the Ministry in September 2018. On the 7th of July 2020, the President of Zimbabwe, Emmerson Mnangagwa dismissed Moyo from the office of Cabinet Minister, removing him for "conduct inappropriate for a Government Minister". This was after Moyo had been arrested and charged with three counts of criminal abuse of duty as a public officer, for his alleged participation in a scam that involves tens of millions of dollars. The Permanent Secretary was Dr. Agnes Mahomva, who in 2018 took over from Major General Dr Gerald Gwinji. Dr. Mahomva is now the Chief Coordinator for the national COVID-19 response in the Office of the President and Cabinet.

The Ministry oversees:

 Hospitals

List of Ministers

References

Government of Zimbabwe
Health in Zimbabwe
Society of Zimbabwe
Zimbabwe